The  ("Ordinance on the Construction and Operation of Narrow-Gauge Railways" / narrow-gauge railway regulations), abbreviated as ESBO, is a German law regulation governing the field of narrow gauge railway operations.

The orders are enacted by the Federal Ministry of Transport based on enabling act through the General Railway Law ("", first issued on 29. March 1951). The supervisory authority is delegated to the Federal Railway Authority of Germany.

The ESBO is based directly on the provisions of the EBO main railway regulations referencing its definitions and regulations. While the EBO concentrates on standardization for transport on national and international level the ESBO allows more options for regional and local systems that are technically incompatible to other railways.

While many of its systems would be governed by Light Railways Act 1896 in the UK it has a different scope so that standard gauge and meter gauge systems in Germany are usually governed by BOStrab light railway regulations that is otherwise modelled for tramways as the operations instructions for BOStrab differ more from EBO than ESBO from EBO.

See also 
 Narrow gauge railways in Germany
 Feldbahn for non-public narrow-gauge systems
 Parkeisenbahn for public miniature railways

Law of Germany
Narrow gauge railways in Germany